Aaron Brooks may refer to:

 Aaron Brooks (American football) (born 1976), American football player
 Aaron Brooks (baseball) (born 1990), American baseball player
 Aaron Brooks (basketball) (born 1985), basketball player
 Aaron Brooks (wrestler) (born 2000/01), American amateur wrestler
 Aaron A. Brooks (born 1964), American drummer